Campbell Wright (born 25 May 2002) is a New Zealand biathlete. In November 2021, he became the second teenager to score Biathlon World Cup points. He represented  New Zealand in biathlon at the 2022 Winter Olympics in Beijing.

Biography
Born in Rotorua on 25 May 2002, Wright is one of four sons of Americans, Scott and Alison Wright, who emigrated to New Zealand in 1993. Scott Wright, an audiologist, was one of the founders of Bay Audiology New Zealand, and sold his interest in the company in 2009. The family moved to the Wānaka area in about 2011. Campbell Wright was educated at Mount Aspiring College.

Wright began cross-country skiing at Snow Farm when he was 10 years old, and took up biathlon in 2017. He competed at the Biathlon Youth World Championships in 2019, 2020 and 2021, with a best result of sixth in the sprint biathlon in 2020. He represented New Zealand at the 2020 Winter Youth Olympics, where he was the team's flagbearer at the opening ceremony, finishing fourth in the 7.5 km sprint biathlon and sixth in the 12.5 km individual biathlon events. He also competed in three cross-country skiing events at the Winter Youth Olympics.

Wright made his senior international debut at the IBU Cup in January 2021. The following month, he was 75th in the 10 km sprint biathlon at the 2021 Biathlon World Championships. Later that year, in November, he debuted in the Biathlon World Cup at Östersund, where he placed 40th in the sprint biathlon, becoming the second teenager in Biathlon World Cup history, after Ole Einar Bjørndalen, to score World Cup points.

In January 2022, Wright was added to the New Zealand team for the 2022 Winter Olympics in Beijing, and he became the second New Zealander to compete in biathlon at a Winter Olympics. In his first event at the Olympics, the 20 km individual, he was the youngest competitor, and finished 32nd in a field of 92 athletes.

References

2002 births
Living people
Sportspeople from Rotorua
People educated at Mount Aspiring College
Biathletes at the 2020 Winter Youth Olympics
Olympic biathletes of New Zealand
Biathletes at the 2022 Winter Olympics